Expedia Cruises is a travel agency franchise company established in 1987, specializing in marketing and sales of air, land & cruise vacations. Through its network of 300 independently owned retail locations and 7,000+ Vacation Consultants in North America, the company has year over year grown in sales for the past two decades.

In 2007, Expedia Inc. had bought a "significant but non-controlling" interest in Vancouver-based cruise vacation specialists CruiseShipCenters International.  As of March 2013, Expedia Inc owns 100% of the company.

In 2020, the Expedia CruiseShipCenters rebranded to Expedia Cruises with the tag line Air, Land & Sea Vacations.

Awards
Expedia Cruises has won awards, for sales, franchise development, and for marketing. These awards include:
 CFA Award of Excellence 2006, 2007, 2008, 2009, 2010, 2011

Corporate office
Located in, Vancouver, British Columbia, the office encompasses the national support team which includes Marketing, Franchise Performance, Franchise Operations, Franchise Development, Training, Information Technology, Finance and Administration.

References

External links
 
 

Expedia Group
Travel agencies
Canadian companies established in 1987
Transport companies established in 1987
Companies based in Vancouver